Michael Quatro (born 12 June 1943, Detroit, Michigan, USA) is a keyboard player and songwriter who has released eleven albums since 1972.  He specializes in keyboard-driven progressive rock.

Career
Quatro's music gained popularity in Detroit, Michigan, where he was popular in clubs and received airplay on FM radio. Quatro's 1972 album Paintings contains the single "Circus (What I Am)", which reached No. 8 on Billboard Magazine's Bubbling Under Hot 100 Singles chart and No. 91 on the Cash Box Top 100 Singles chart. He has sold 20 records worldwide. Ted Nugent played guitar on one track on his second album, while his third album featured Rick Derringer on guitar and Mark Volman and Howard Kaylan from The Turtles.

Quatro is an independent entertainment executive and the older brother of musician Suzi Quatro. When record producer Mickie Most was in Detroit, Quatro persuaded him to see Cradle featuring his sisters Suzi, Patti, Arlene and Nancy. Most waited for Cradle to break up before signing Suzi as a solo act. As a result, she became the first female bass player to become a major rock star.

Discography

Albums

1972: Paintings (Evolution) as Michael Quatro Jam Band
1973: Look Deeply into the Mirror (Evolution) as Michael Quatro Jam Band
1975: In Collaboration with the Gods (United Artists) - AUS #73
1976: Dancers, Romancers, Dreamers, and Schemers (United Artists)
1977: Gettin' Ready (Prodigal Records, a Motown label)
1980: The Selections Of Paintings (Koala, a Tennessee label) 1979 re-recordings of the Painting album
1980: Into The Mirror (Koala) 1979 re-recordings of the Look Deeply Into The Mirror album
1980: Selections of Dancers, Romancers (Koala) 1979 re-recordings of the Dancers, Romancers, Dreamers & Schemers album
1980: It's Only A Love Song (Koala) as Mike Quatro; remixed reissue of Gettin' Ready
1980: Mirage (Koala) as Mike Quatro, mini-album of new songs; also released as Michael Quatro Band with added previously released tracks (Quality Records)
1981: Bottom Line (Spector International Records)
1995: Vision (Quatrophonic Music USA)
2004: Romantic/Classical/New Age (Quatrophonic Music USA)
2005: The Shadow of the King (Reiwan)
2006: Heavenward (Reiwan)

Singles
1972: "Circus (What I Am)"
1995: "Song of the Sea"

References

External links

American singer-songwriters
Living people
1943 births